Yves Bélanger may refer to:

 Yves Bélanger (ice hockey) (born 1952), Canadian ice hockey player
 Yves Bélanger (cinematographer) (born 1960), Canadian cinematographer